A by-election was held for the New South Wales Legislative Assembly electorate of Armidale on 12 December 1903 because of the resignation of Edmund Lonsdale to successfully contest the federal seat of New England.

Dates

Result

				

Edmund Lonsdale resigned to successfully contest the federal seat of New England.

See also
Electoral results for the district of Armidale
List of New South Wales state by-elections

Notes

References

1903 elections in Australia
New South Wales state by-elections
1900s in New South Wales